The 1923 Akron football team was an American football team that represented the University of Akron in the Ohio Athletic Conference (OAC) during the 1923 college football season. In its ninth season under head coach Fred Sefton, the team compiled a 4–3–1 record (2–3–1 against conference opponents) and outscored opponents by a total of 92 to 37. Quarterback Ed Kregenow was the team captain.

Schedule

References

Akron
Akron Zips football seasons
Akron football